Harpalus aterrimus is a species of ground beetle in the subfamily Harpalinae. It was described by Casey in 1914.

References

aterrimus
Beetles described in 1914